This is a list of past and current experiments at the CERN Proton Synchrotron (PS) facility since its commissioning in 1959. The PS was CERN's first synchrotron and the world's highest energy particle accelerator at the time. It served as the flagship of CERN until the 1980s when its main role became to provide injection beams to other machines such as the Super Proton Synchrotron.

The information is gathered from the INSPIRE-HEP database.

See also 
Experiments
 List of Super Proton Synchrotron experiments
 List of Large Hadron Collider experiments
 Facilities
 CERN: European Organization for Nuclear Research
 PS: Proton Synchrotron
 SPS: Super Proton Synchrotron
 ISOLDE: On-Line Isotope Mass Separator
 ISR: Intersecting Storage Rings
 LEP: Large Electron–Positron Collider
 LHC: Large Hadron Collider

References 

PS
Physics-related lists
Particle experiments